Rock House is a census-designated place (CDP) in Gila County, Arizona, United States. The population was 50 at the 2010 census.

Geography
The CDP is located in west-central Gila County in the valley of the Salt River east (upstream) of Theodore Roosevelt Lake.

Demographics

See also

 List of census-designated places in Arizona

References

Census-designated places in Gila County, Arizona